MechaCon was an annual three-day anime convention held during the summer at the Hyatt Regency New Orleans in New Orleans, Louisiana. It was the oldest active anime convention in Louisiana.

Programming
The convention typically offered an artist's alley, cosplay competition, dealer's room, gaming, and maid/host show.

History
MechaCon's inaugural weekend in 2005 is unique because Hurricane Katrina made landfall on the coast of Louisiana hours after MechaCon closed its doors. The dealers room closed early and all but one guest made their flight. In 2006, as a special part of MechaCon's 2006 programming, Harmony Gold USA provided fans of the Robotech franchise with the first-ever public screening of the film Robotech: The Shadow Chronicles. 100% of the funds raised from the screening was donated to The Salvation Army’s ongoing Hurricane Katrina and Hurricane Rita recovery efforts. 

A 2019 press release announced that the final Mechacon, dubbed "Mechacon Omega," would be held in July 2020. MechaCon 2020 was cancelled due to the COVID-19 pandemic. The final MechaCon was held from July 23-25, 2021.

Event history

References

Other Related News Articles
WGNO’s Adam Bowles showcases all of the crazy costumes at Mechacon! WGNO, Retrieved 2018-08-07

External links
 MechaCon Website

Defunct anime conventions
Recurring events established in 2005
2005 establishments in Louisiana
Annual events in Louisiana
Festivals in New Orleans
Tourist attractions in New Orleans
Conventions in Louisiana